The 1980 Big League World Series took place from August 16–23 in Fort Lauderdale, Florida, United States. Buena Park, California defeated Orlando, Florida in the championship game.

Teams

Results

References

Big League World Series
Big League World Series